Bluing may refer to:
 Bluing (fabric), blue dye used to improve the appearance of fabrics 
 Bluing (hair), blue dye used to improve the appearance of hair
 Mrs. Stewart's Bluing, brand of fabric and hair bluing
 Bluing (steel), passivation process in which steel is partially protected against rust
 "bluing" of machine parts to check for tolerances, see engineer's blue